Motawi Tileworks was founded by Nawal Motawi (B.F.A. University of Michigan) in 1992. The company handcrafts art tiles in its Ann Arbor, Michigan studio. These tiles are known for their American designs, inspired by works of the Arts and Crafts Movement, and include such subjects as nature, art and architecture. Some of the artists whose work has been adapted by Motawi include Charley Harper, Dard Hunter and Frank Lloyd Wright.

Most tiles produced by Motawi are either styled in “Relief”, a low-relief sculpture colored with a single glaze, or “Polychrome”, a separation of several colors by a small ridge of clay.

References 

O'Donnell, Anne Stewart, Motawi Tileworks: Contemporary Handcrafted Tiles in the Arts & Crafts Tradition, Pomegranate Communications (September 2008).
Motawi Tileworks, Shannon Sharpe, Jan 6, 2010.
Stage Two Strategies.(Motawi Tileworks), Dustin Walsh, May 17, 2010.
Ann Arbor's Motawi Tileworks enters new market with production of Arts & Crafts Teco pottery vases, Janet Miller, Oct 15, 2010.
Motawi Tileworks acquires supplier, plans 3 new positions, Jon Zemke, May 25, 2011.

External links 
 Motawi Tileworks
 Video of Motawi Tileworks segment from PBS show, 'Craft in America', December 11, 2015

Ceramic art
Culture of Ann Arbor, Michigan
1992 establishments in the United States
Arts and Crafts movement